They Just Had to Get Married is a 1932 American pre-Code comedy film directed by Edward Ludwig and starring Slim Summerville, ZaSu Pitts, Roland Young, and Verree Teasdale.

The screenplay was written by Gladys Lehman, H.M. Walker, and an uncredited Preston Sturges, based on the Broadway play A Pair of Silk Stockings (1914) by Cyril Harcourt. This was the play's third film adaptation.

Plot
When wealthy Henry Davidson dies, he leaves all his money to his faithful butler, Sam Sutton (Summerville), and maid, Molly Hull (Pitts), who are finally able to get married.  Their new lives as millionaires gets them involved with flirtatious Lola Montrose (Teasdale) and Davidson's relative Hillary Hume (Young), and complications ensue.

Sam and Molly lose everything, break up, and are finally tricked into reconciling.

Cast
Slim Summerville as Sam Sutton
ZaSu Pitts as Molly Hull
Roland Young as Hillary Hume
Verree Teasdale as Lola Montrose
C. Aubrey Smith as Hampton
Robert Greig as Radcliff
David Landau as Montrose
Elizabeth Patterson as Lizzie
Wallis Clark as Fairchilds
David Leo Tillotson as Wilmont
Vivien Oakland as Mrs. Fairchilds
William Burress as Bradford
Louise Mackintosh as Mrs. Bradford
Bertram Marburgh as Langley
Virginia Howell as Mrs. Langley
James Donlan as Clerk
Henry Armetta as Tony
Fifi D'Orsay as Marie
Cora Sue Collins as Rosalie

Production
The original title of this film was They Had to Get Married. However, the Hays Office disapproved of this title, and requested the addition of the world "just". They Just Had to Get Married was the third film version of Cyril Harcourt's 1914 play, A Pair of Silk Stockings. The first two were both silent films: a 1918 Lewis J. Selznick presentation also called A Pair of Silk Stockings, and a 1927 Universal film, Silk Stockings. These films are unrelated to the 1957 film, Silk Stockings, a musical remake of Ninotchka (1939).

The film premiered in San Diego, California on December 22, 1932, and went into general American release on January 5, 1933.

Notes

External links

1932 comedy films
1932 films
American black-and-white films
American comedy films
American films based on plays
Films directed by Edward Ludwig
Universal Pictures films
1930s American films